Sefer ha-Chinuch ("Book of Education")  is a Jewish rabbinic text which systematically discusses the 613 commandments of the Torah. It was published anonymously in 13th-century Spain.

History
The work's enumeration of the commandments (sing. mitzvah) is based upon Maimonides' system of counting as per his Sefer Hamitzvot; each is listed according to its appearance in the weekly Torah portion and the work is structured correspondingly.

The book separately discusses each of the 613 commandments, both from a legal and a moral perspective. For each, the Chinuch's discussion starts by linking the mitzvah to its Biblical source, and then addresses the philosophical underpinnings of the commandment (here, termed the "shoresh", or "root"). Following this, the Chinuch presents a brief overview of the halakha (practical Jewish law) governing its observance - usually based on Maimonides' Mishneh Torah - and closes with a summary as to the commandment's applicability.

Because of this structure, the work remains popular to this day. The philosophic portions are widely quoted and taught, while the legal discussion provides the basis for much further study in yeshivot. The Minchat Chinuch by "Rabbeinu Yosef" (Yosef Ben Moshe Babad, 1800–1874), Av Beit Din of Ternopil, serves as a legal commentary.

The sixteenth century author Gedaliah ibn Yaḥyah credited the Sefer ha-Chinuch to Rabbi Aharon HaLevi of Barcelona (1235-c. 1290), a Talmudic scholar and halakhist; but others disagree, as the views of the Chinuch contradict opinions held by HaLevi in other works. This has led to the conclusion that the true author to Sefer HaChinuch was a different Reb Aharon Halevi, a student of the Rashba, rather than his colleague. Though there is a debate about who is the true author, it is agreed upon that the Sefer ha-Chinuch was written by a father to his son, upon reaching the age of Bar Mitzvah. In 1980, Professor Israel Ta-Shma of the Hebrew University of Jerusalem argued that the author of "Sefer ha-Chinuch" was in fact Aaron's brother, Pinchas ben Joseph ha-Levi, who had written the work.

See also
Sefer Mitzvot Gadol
Sefer Mitzvot Katan
Ben Ish Chai
Rabbinic literature

References

Further reading
Translation: The Book of Mitzvah Education. Charles Wengrow. Feldheim 1992. 
Discussion: A Philosophy of Mitzvot. Gersion Appel. Ktav 1975. 
Classes: A Study of the 613 Mitvot and their Meanings in our Lives. Rabbi David Botton. teachittome.com

External links
Hebrew Books: The Guarding of the Brit and the Guarding of the Eyes
Jewish Encyclopedia: Hinnuk
Sefaria.org: Sefer HaChinuch

Rabbinic legal texts and responsa
13th-century books
Jewish medieval literature
Works published anonymously
Hebrew-language religious books
Hebrew words and phrases in Jewish law